This is a partial list of Greenlandic Inuit. The Arctic and subarctic dwelling Inuit (formerly referred to as Eskimo) are a group of culturally similar indigenous peoples.

 Arnarsaq, translator, interpreter and missionary
 Arnarulunnguaq (1896–1933), native Greenlandic woman who accompanied Knud Rasmussen on his Fifth Thule Expedition 
 Aron of Kangeq, hunter, painter, and oral historian
 Hans Hendrik, Arctic traveller and interpreter
 Kuupik Kleist, Prime Minister of Greenland
 Henrik Lund, lyricist, painter and priest
 Lena Pedersen, Canadian politician, born in Greenland
 Bishop Sofie Petersen (b. 1955), Lutheran Bishop of Greenland
 Minik Wallace (ca. 1890–1918), boy treated as living exhibit
 Karla Jessen Williamson, activist, educator and researcher

See also
 List of Inuit

External links

 
Inuit
Greenlandic Inuit
Inuit